This is a list of known objects which occupy, have occupied, or are planned to occupy any of the five Lagrange points of two-body systems in space.

Sun–Earth Lagrange points

Sun–Earth L1 
 is the Lagrange point located approximately 1.5 million kilometers from Earth towards the Sun.

Past probes
Currently in heliocentric orbit. The Sun–Earth L1 is also the point to which the Reboot ISEE-3 mission was attempting to return the craft as the first phase of a recovery mission (as of September 25, 2014 all efforts have failed and contact was lost).
It returned briefly in late 2004 before being pushed into heliocentric orbit in early 2005.
LISA Pathfinder used an instrument consisting of two small gold alloy cubes.
The Chang'e 5 orbiter (during extended mission. After ferrying lunar samples back to Earth in 2020, the transport module was sent to  where it is permanently stationed to conduct limited Earth-Sun observations.)

Present probes

 The Solar and Heliospheric Observatory (SOHO) in a halo orbit
 The Advanced Composition Explorer (ACE) in a Lissajous orbit
 WIND (At  since 2004)
 The Deep Space Climate Observatory (DSCOVR), designed to image the sunlit Earth in 10 wavelengths (EPIC) and monitor total reflected radiation (NISTAR). Launched on 11 February 2015, began orbiting L1 on 8 June 2015 to study the solar wind and its effects on Earth. DSCOVR is unofficially known as GORESAT, because it carries a camera always oriented to Earth and capturing full-frame photos of the planet similar to the Blue Marble. This concept was proposed by then-Vice President of the United States Al Gore in 1998 and was a centerpiece in his 2006 film An Inconvenient Truth.

Planned probes
Aditya-L1
Interstellar Mapping and Acceleration Probe slated for launch in late 2024
NEO Surveyor
SWFO-L1
Vigil (ESA). One spacecraft in L1 and one in L5.

Sun–Earth L2 
 is the Lagrange point located approximately 1.5 million kilometers from Earth in the direction opposite the Sun. Spacecraft at the Sun–Earth L2 point are in a Lissajous orbit until decommissioned, when they are sent into a heliocentric graveyard orbit.

Past probes

2001 – 2010: NASA's Wilkinson Microwave Anisotropy Probe (WMAP) observed the cosmic microwave background. It was moved to a heliocentric orbit to avoid posing a hazard to future missions.
2003 – 2004: NASA's WIND.
2009 – 2013: The ESA Herschel Space Observatory exhausted its supply of liquid helium and was moved from the Lagrangian point in June 2013.
2009 – 2013: At the end of its mission ESA's Planck spacecraft was put into a heliocentric orbit and passivated to prevent it from endangering any future missions.
2011 – 2012: CNSA's Chang'e 2. Chang'e 2 was then placed onto a heliocentric orbit that took it past the near-Earth asteroid 4179 Toutatis.

Present probes

 The ESA Gaia probe
 The joint Russian-German high-energy astrophysics observatory Spektr-RG
 The joint NASA, ESA and CSA James Webb Space Telescope (JWST)

Planned probes
The ESA Euclid mission, to better understand dark energy and dark matter by accurately measuring the acceleration of the universe.
The NASA Nancy Grace Roman Space Telescope (WFIRST)
The ESA PLATO mission, which will find and characterize rocky exoplanets. 
The JAXA LiteBIRD mission.
The ESA Advanced Telescope for High ENergy Astrophysics (ATHENA) 
The ESA ARIEL mission, which will observe the atmospheres of exoplanets.
The joint ESA-JAXA Comet Interceptor
The NASA Large Ultraviolet Optical Infrared Surveyor (LUVOIR) which would replace the Hubble Space Telescope.

Cancelled probes
The ESA Eddington mission
The NASA Terrestrial Planet Finder mission (may be placed in an Earth-trailing orbit instead)

Sun–Earth L3 
 is the Sun–Earth Lagrange point located on the side of the Sun opposite Earth, slightly outside the Earth's orbit.
 There are no known objects in this orbital location.

Sun–Earth L4 
 is the Sun–Earth Lagrange point located close to the Earth's orbit 60° ahead of Earth.

 Asteroid  is the first discovered tadpole orbit companion to Earth, orbiting ; like Earth, its mean distance to the Sun is about one astronomical unit.
 OSIRIS-REx passed near the L4 point and performed a survey for asteroids between 9 and 20 February 2017.

Sun–Earth L5 
 is the Sun–Earth Lagrange point located close to the Earth's orbit 60° behind Earth.

Asteroid , in a horseshoe companion orbit with Earth, is currently proximal to  but at a high inclination.
The Spitzer Space Telescope is in an Earth-trailing heliocentric orbit drifting away c. 0.1 AU per year. In c. 2013–15 it has passed  in its orbit.
Hayabusa2 passed near  during the spring of 2017, and imaged the surrounding area to search for Earth trojans on 18 April 2018.

Proposed
Vigil (ESA). One spacecraft in L5 and one in L1.

Earth–Moon Lagrange points

Earth–Moon L2 
 THEMIS
 Chang'e 5-T1 
 Queqiao relay satellite
 EQUULEUS nanosat.

Earth–Moon L4 and L5 
Kordylewski clouds
Future location of TDRS-style communication satellites to support  satellite and further regions on the Moon.

Past probes
Hiten did not find any conclusive increase in dust density at Lagrange points.

Proposed objects
 Exploration Gateway Platform
The inhabitants of the L5 Society should convert lunar material to huge solar power satellites. Many works of fiction, most notably the Gundam series, involve colonies at these locations.

Sun–Venus Lagrange points

L4

Sun–Mars Lagrange points

They may also be called Mars Lagrangian asteroids.

L4

L5
5261 Eureka

Source: Minor Planet Center

Sun–Jupiter Lagrange points

L4
Trojan asteroids, Greek camp

L5
Trojan asteroids, Trojan camp

Planned 

 Lucy (spacecraft)

Saturn–Tethys Lagrange points

L4
Telesto

L5
Calypso

Saturn–Dione Lagrange points

L4
 Helene

L5
 Polydeuces, follows a "tadpole" orbit around L5

Sun–Uranus Lagrange points

L3
 83982 Crantor, follows a horseshoe orbit around L3

L4

Sun–Neptune Lagrange points

Data from: Minor Planet Center

L4

 385571 Otrera
 385695 Clete

L5

Tables of missions

Color key:

Future and proposed missions

See also
Trojan (celestial body)
Co-orbital configuration

Footnotes

Trojans (astronomy)
Space lists